Ashūradeh, or Ashur Ada, is the only island of the Iranian coast of the Caspian Sea (Gorgan Bay).

The island can be reached via Bandar Torkaman. Over 40% of Iran's caviar is produced near Ashūradeh Island.

History

Ashuradeh was inhabited by 300 families, but the village is now deserted. 
The island was occupied by Russian forces in 1837, despite protests from Persia. Following the occupation, the Russian Army maintained a military post on the island for a few decades until 1921.

References

External links
 Memar, Parya,  „New urban Settlements in the ecological context; Miānqāla and its new settlement in the south eastern coasts of Caspian Sea“. In: Sustainable Development of Emerging Settlement Patterns, Berlin 2006:  pp. 88–102 (ISBN 978-3-7983- 2022-2)
Etymology of Ashuradeh Islands
Ashuradeh Island Profile
Pictures

Landforms of Golestan Province
Islands of Iran
Islands of the Caspian Sea